Ryazan Province may refer to:
Ryazan Oblast (est. 1937), a federal subject of Russia
Ryazan Governorate (1796–1929), an administrative division of the Russian Empire and the early Russian SFSR